1905–1906 census of the Ottoman Empire was the last population count. This census effort concentrated on Iraq and Arabian peninsula as European and Anatolian has well established. Ottoman government decided to perform the count in three months compared to years during the ones performed 19th century.

Bibliography

Notes

References

Censuses in the Ottoman Empire
Census
Census